Miks Indrašis (born 30 September 1990) is a Latvian professional ice hockey forward who is currently playing with Schwenninger Wild Wings in the Deutsche Eishockey Liga (DEL).

Playing career

Junior
Indrašis began playing hockey in Latvian minor and youth leagues. During this period he played for Liepājas Metalurgs youth team and SK LSPA/Riga.

During the 2009–10 season, he played with Dinamo Juniors Riga. When in 2010 HK Rīga a Minor Hockey League affiliate of Dinamo Rīga was founded, the team was assembled mostly from Dinamo Juniors Riga players. Indrašis had a productive 2010–11 season with HK Rīga, scoring 21 goals and 53 points in 56 games.

Professional
Indrašis split 2011–12 season between HK Rīga in MHL, HK Liepājas Metalurgs in Belarusian Extraleague and Dinamo Rīga in KHL.

On 2 October 2011, Indrašis received his second recall to Dinamo Riga and made his debut in the Kontinental Hockey League (KHL) on 5 October 2011 in a game against HC Spartak Moscow. However his break came when Ted Nolan selected Indrašis for 2012 World Championship roster. He played the tournament on the first line along with Jānis Sprukts and Miķelis Rēdlihs, scoring three goals and 5 points in 7 games.

After the breakthrough in world championships, Indrašis signed a three-year contract with Dinamo Rīga. At the start of the season, Indrašis continued to show his scoring touch, but his production decreased in the middle of the season. At this point, Indrašis was sent affiliate team. Later, he was recalled and spent the rest of the season with Dinamo.

Indrašis went to NHL Chicago Blackhawks and Vancouver Canucks summer camps in 2012 and 2013 respectively.

After two productive seasons with Dynamo Moscow, Indrašis returned to Dinamo Riga by signing a one-year contract on 28 July 2020. In the 2020–21 season, Indrašis led the club in scoring across all categories with 16 goals, 23 assists and 39 points through 49 regular season games.

Indrašis again left Dinamo as a free agent, remaining in the KHL by agreeing to a contract with HC Vityaz on 18 May 2021.

After splitting the 2021–22 season between Vityaz and Admiral Vladivostok, posting a combined 17 points through 46 games, Indrašis continued his season in moving to the Swiss National League, agreeing to a contract with EHC Biel on 15 February 2022.

On 25 July 2022, Indrašis signed a one-year contract with German club Schwenninger Wild Wings of the DEL for the 2022–23 season.

International play
Indrašis was selected to make his debut for the Latvian national team in the 2012 IIHF World Championship Stockholm Sweden. His debut came on 5 May 2012, and he scored the 1–0 goal in that game (although Latvia went on to lose 2–5 against Russia). He continued to have a successful tournament becoming the top scorer of the tournament for team Latvia. and was selected as one of the best players of team Latvia in the tournament.
Indrašis was again selected for 2013 World Championship roster for the Latvian national team, but had a less productive tournament registering only one assist in 7 games.

Career statistics

Regular season and playoffs

International

References

External links

1990 births
Living people
Admiral Vladivostok players
EHC Biel players
Dinamo Riga players
HC Dynamo Moscow players
HK Liepājas Metalurgs players
HK Riga players
Ice hockey players at the 2014 Winter Olympics
Ice hockey players at the 2022 Winter Olympics
Latvian ice hockey right wingers
Olympic ice hockey players of Latvia
Ice hockey people from Riga
Schwenninger Wild Wings players
HC Vityaz players